Mission Ranch is a historic hotel and restaurant in Carmel-by-the-Sea, Monterey County, California, United States. It is located south of downtown Carmel, near the Carmel Mission, at 26270 Dolores Street. The property was bought in 1986 by Clint Eastwood, who restored the premises in the style of the original buildings. The Mission Ranch includes  with views of Point Lobos, Carmel River Beach and the Pacific Ocean. The Hotel has 31 rooms located within ten buildings on the property.

History

The Mission Ranch once included  and was owned by Juan Romero, a native American. In 1852, Romero deeded the property to William J. Curtis, a Monterey storekeeper, for $300.  Curtis sold the property to Lafayette F., and Annie Loveland in 1856. William Martin of Scotland arrived in Monterey in 1856 by ship with his family. His son, John Martin, bought land around the Carmel River from Loveland in 1859. He built the Martin Ranch on  that went as far as the Carmel River to the homes along Carmel Point. The ranch became known as the Mission Ranch because it was so close to the Carmel Mission. They farmed potatoes and barley and had a milk dairy. The property became one of the first of the early California dairies. The creamery, which supplied the county with cheese and butter, now houses the restaurant. The barns were used for hay and milking. The owner retired from the dairy business in 1917 and put 65 cows up for auction. 

Carmel Martin, the youngest of the Martin boys, sold the ranch on August 23, 1929, to millionaire tycoon Willis J. Walker of Pebble Beach, who was chairman of the Red River Lumber Company. His father, Thomas B. Walker, was an business magnate who acquired lumber in Minnesota and California and became an art collector. 

On September 6, 1931, a rodeo was held at the Mission Ranch, which included bronco and steer riding and roping. In November 1936, Walker refurbished the ranch buildings, adding a wood floor and stage for a dance hall. On January 23, 1937, the Mission Ranch Club opened with a grand opening as a club serving lunch and dinner. In November 1937, the Mission Ranch began providing rooms for visitors.

During World War II, the Mission Ranch operated as an officers' club for the United States Army and United States Navy. It was owned by the Margaret and Bertram Dienelt, who had the ranch for 39 years. The restaurant featured dance bands and a bar. In the 1940s, the Dienelts sold several acres of the ranch to the Carmel Unified School District, which built the Carmel River Elementary School.

Clint Eastwood bought the ranch in 1986, rescuing it from a condominium development. He restored the property in the style of the original buildings. Buildings on the property reflect the architectural period of the 1850s, that includes the restaurant and dance barn and the century old Martin farmhouse and bunkhouse.

In the 1959 movie A Summer Place, with characters Ken Jorgenson (Richard Egan) and Sylvia (Dorothy McGuire) have a beach house, which was filmed at the Clinton Walker House with scenes filmed at a cottage located at Mission Ranch Hotel and Restaurant.

Today
The Mission Ranch has a venue for weddings, corporate dinners, and special events. The property has an open meadow land that is home to sheep that live at the ranch. The Mission Ranch Tennis and Fitness Club is a private club for Mission Ranch members, and for the hotel guests of Mission Ranch and the Homestead.

See also
 Timeline of Carmel-by-the-Sea, California

References

External links

 Mission Ranch

Carmel-by-the-Sea, California
Hotels in California
1852 establishments in California